{{Infobox comic book title 
| image = X-Men_208.jpg
| image_size = 250
| caption = Cover art for X-Men: Legacy #208 (February 2008) by David Finch
| schedule = Monthly
| format = Ongoing
| publisher = Marvel Comics
| date = {{collapsible list|X-Men (vol. 2)October 1991 – June 2001Issues #1 to #113 New X-MenJuly 2001 – June 2004Issues #114 to #156X-Men (vol. 2)July 2004 – January 2008Issues #157 to #207X-Men: Legacy February 2008 – October 2012Issues #208 to #275X-Men: Legacy (vol. 2) November 2012 – March 2014Issues #1 to #24, #300}}
| issues =
| main_char_team = X-MenProfessor XRogueLegion
| writers = 
| artists = 
| pencillers = 
| inkers = 
| colorists =
| creative_team_month =
| creative_team_year = 
| creators = Chris ClaremontJim Lee
}}X-Men: Legacy is a comic book series published by Marvel Comics featuring the mutant superhero team the X-Men.

The title began its publication in October 1991 as X-Men (vol. 2). From 2001 until 2004 it was published as New X-Men. It had reverted from issue #157 to its original title X-Men, but changed again from issue #208 to X-Men: Legacy. Prior to the name change, the series is usually referred to as X-Men (vol. 2) because the first series, Uncanny X-Men, was titled The X-Men prior to 1981. In addition, a new unrelated ongoing series titled X-Men was later released starting in 2010, and is generally referred to as X-Men (vol. 3).

X-Men: Legacy was relaunched in 2012 as part of Marvel NOW! with a new issue #1. The new volume, written by Simon Spurrier, focuses on Legion, son of the recently deceased Professor X, and his mission to preemptively help mutantkind while attempting to get his many personalities under control. The volume ended its run after 25 issues in March 2014, but not before reverting to its original numbering with the final issue, X-Men: Legacy #300.

Title history

Publication history
X-Men (vol. 2)

In 1991, Marvel launched X-Men (vol. 2) as a spin-off of the parent title Uncanny X-Men, with co-writers Chris Claremont and Jim Lee, previously the penciler on Uncanny, moving over to X-Men, while studio mate Whilce Portacio took over penciling duties on Uncanny. X-Men #1 is still the bestselling comic book of all time, with pre-order sales of over 8.1 million copies, according to Guinness Book of World Records, which presented honors to Claremont at the 2010 San Diego Comic-ConJohnson, Rich. [X-Men #1 The Guinness World Record Best Selling Comic Of All Time?], Bleeding Cool, July 22, 2010 It is estimated that somewhere between 3–4 million copies were actually sold. The sales figures were generated in part by publishing the issue with five different variant covers, four of which showed different characters from the book that combined into a tetraptych image, and a fifth, gatefold cover that combined these four, large numbers of which were purchased by retailers, who anticipated fans and speculators who would buy multiple copies in order to acquire a complete collection of the covers.
Chris Claremont left after three issues due to creative differences with editor Bob Harras. Writers John Byrne and Scott Lobdell handled dialogue to Lee's plotting after Claremont's departure, and Lee himself left the title after issue #11 to form a new company, Image Comics with several other Marvel artists. Various creative teams contributed to the series from 1992 to 2001, with notable writers including Fabian Nicieza, Scott Lobdell, and Joe Kelly, with Chris Claremont returning to the title for a short run ten years after his original departure. Artists included Andy Kubert, and Carlos Pacheco among many others.

Initially, the book focused on the Blue team led by Cyclops, with the other members forming the Gold team led by Storm. This premise has at times faded from mention, only to be resurrected, with the X-Men divided at times into two and even three separate squads. Important events and crossovers covered by the series include the wedding of Jean Grey and Cyclops, X-Cutioner's Song, the Legacy virus, Fatal Attractions, Legion Quest and Onslaught. The series was interrupted and replaced by Amazing X-Men for four issues in 1995 as part of the Age of Apocalypse crossover.

New X-Men

In July 2001 during a revamp of the X-Men franchise, X-Men (vol. 2) was retitled to New X-Men starting with issue 114, featuring an ambigram logo. Along with these modifications, a new writer, Grant Morrison, was assigned to the title. These changes by the newly appointed Marvel Comics editor-in-chief, Joe Quesada, reflected his idea for flagship titles like X-Men to regain some of their former glory, as well as regaining critical acclaim.

Morrison's tenure on the title dealt with Cyclops, Wolverine, Phoenix, Beast, Emma Frost and Xorn. While the second squad of X-Men in Uncanny continued on as (now undercover) super heroes, Grant Morrison redirected these X-Men's mission to that of teachers. Additionally, New X-Men artist Frank Quitely redesigned the look of the team, giving them sleek, leather / polyester outfits instead of their traditional superhero uniforms for a more contemporary look and feel.

Some more of the long-lasting changes that occurred during Morrison's run were the secondary mutation of Beast to resemble a lion-like rather than his former ape-like appearance, and Emma Frost introduced as a member of the team, recreating the ties between Jean Grey and the Phoenix (retconning the retcon), and the death of Phoenix. The school expanded from simply a training center to a legitimate school with dozens of mutant students, a story idea that was first explored in the X-Men film. One of the more controversial events of New X-Men happened in issue #115 when the island of Genosha and its inhabitants, including Magneto, were completely destroyed. This set the tone that dominated the rest of Morrison's tenure on the book.

In June 2004, Chuck Austen, previously the writer of Uncanny X-Men, moved to New X-Men with issue #155. The title of the series reverted to its original title of X-Men in July 2004 with issue #157 during the "X-Men Reload" event. Peter Milligan became the new writer of the series with issue #166 and was replaced by Mike Carey with issue #188.

X-Men: Legacy
Volume 1
The title was renamed X-Men: Legacy starting in February 2008 with issue #208.  The new title reflects a shift in the series direction to focusing on solo X-Men characters versus being a team-based book as the title was previously.

The re-titled series follows on from the conclusion of the Messiah Complex crossover, where Professor X was accidentally shot in the head by Bishop. Shortly after the X-Men presumed him deceased, his body disappeared and his whereabouts were unknown. X-Men: Legacy initially followed the Professor's presumed road to recovery as well as the encounters he faced, such as a battle with the mutant Exodus on the psychic plane and discoveries about his past that include Mr. Sinister.

Many characters have been featured in the title, including Rogue, Magneto, Gambit, and the Acolytes. The title also featured flashbacks relevant to the ongoing present story as well as answered dangling plot lines throughout X-Men continuity.

As of issue #226, Rogue replaced Professor Xavier as the central character. Having now achieved control over her absorption powers, Scott Summers (Cyclops) has repositioned Rogue as mentor to the younger mutants under the protection of the X-Men on Utopia. Rogue is in the unique position to be able to help the students, due to her abilities, allowing fresh insight to their use and control. She has so far, also, been shown to face off against notable deadly adversaries including: Emplate and Proteus. She also took part in the X-Men: Second Coming crossover, acknowledging her special link to Hope.

The title was one of two ongoing books to house the Age of X crossover. The comic briefly followed the fallout from that story and featured a team composed of Rogue, Magneto, Gambit, Professor X, Legion, and Frenzy, but now follows Rogue's team of X-Men affiliated with the Jean Grey School for Higher Learning, featuring Gambit, Frenzy, Cannonball and Rachel Grey.

Volume 2
As part of the Marvel NOW! relaunch event, Volume 1 of X-Men: Legacy ended with issue #275. The X-Men: Legacy title was relaunched as a new series with a new issue #1, written by Simon Spurrier and penciled by Tan Eng Huat. The new series focused on Legion, the son of the recently murdered Charles Xavier, who is struggling to keep his multitude of personalities under control while trying to honor his father's legacy by preemptively fighting off threats to mutants using his many powers.

The 25th issue of the volume was renumbered #300 to commemorate the longevity of the series.  Issue #300 features a plot by a collaboration between the three X-Men: Legacy writers, Mike Carey, Christos Gage and Simon Spurrier. This is also the final issue of X-Men: Legacy.

A third volume of X-Men: Legacy was planned, to be written by Chris Claremont.  However, that series was renamed Nightcrawler after its featured character.

Relationship with other X-Men titles
Since the introduction of X-Men, the plotlines of this series and other X-Books have been interwoven to varying degrees. For most of its run, X-Men has featured a completely different team of X-Men than other titles featuring the X-Men. While it was not uncommon for characters of one book to appear in the other, any major stories concerning characters were dealt with in their own team book.

X-Men and Uncanny X-Men have shared two periods of time where they were more or less treated as a single, fortnightly series. In both of these cases they shared an author: 1995 to 1996 by Scott Lobdell and 1999 to 2000 by Alan Davis. During these times, the plotlines from X-Men and Uncanny X-Men led directly into each other.

In July 2004, the cast of New X-Men was moved to the newly relaunched Astonishing X-Men, and most of the cast of the Uncanny X-Men was transferred to X-Men, vol. 2. With three main X-Men series running concurrently, members from each book continue to appear in the other titles.

Team roster

Professor X is the Headmaster of Xavier's School for Gifted Youngsters and mentor to the X-Men, but he is rarely a field operative of the team. In his role as mentor he has typically been present in the book, but he has notable absences, including issues #59–71 (in government custody after the Onslaught crisis) and #99–106 (educating Cadre K in space).

At many times the team roster has been the same as that appearing in Uncanny X-Men and during two periods, the two books have even been treated by their writer as a single bi-weekly title (issues #46–69 by Scott Lobdell and issues #85–99 by Alan Davis).

During issues #90–93 Wolverine was replaced by a Skrull infiltrator, leading to the storylines "The Shattering" and "The Twelve" and the Astonishing X-Men (vol. 2) limited series.

Gambit's group of students appeared prominently in issues #171–174, featuring the debuts of future recurring characters Onyxx and Bling!

After moving to Utopia in issue #227, Rogue became mentor to the various X-Men-in-training, who regularly appeared in issues alongside her.

Contributors

Regular writers
Chris Claremont, 1991
Plots from Jim Lee and scripts by John Byrne or Scott Lobdell, 1991–1992
Fabian Nicieza, 1992–1995
Scott Lobdell, 1995–1997
Joe Kelly, 1997–1999
Alan Davis, 1999–2000
Chris Claremont, 2000–2001
Scott Lobdell, 2001
Grant Morrison, 2001–2004
Chuck Austen, 2004
Peter Milligan, 2005–2006
Mike Carey, 2006–2011
Christos Gage, 2012
Simon Spurrier, 2012–2014

Regular artists
Jim Lee, 1991–1992
Andy Kubert, 1992–1996
Carlos Pacheco, 1997–1998
Adam Kubert, 1998–1999
Alan Davis, 1999–2000
Leinil Francis Yu, 2000–2001
Frank Quitely, 2001–2003
Other artists, including Igor Kordey and Ethan Van Sciver, often illustrated issues because Quitely was running very far behind on deadlines.
No regular artist, 2003–2004
Several illustrators, notably Phil Jimenez and Marc Silvestri, completed brief stints on the book due to deadline complications with previous art teams.
Salvador Larroca, 2004–2006
Humberto Ramos, 2006–2007
Chris Bachalo, 2006–2008
Scot Eaton, 2008–2009
Other artists used for the flashback sequences throughout Xavier's quest include John Romita Jr., Greg Land, Billy Tan, and Mike Deodato.
Daniel Acuña, 2009
Clay Mann, 2010
David Baldeon, 2012
Tat Eng Huat, 2012–2014

Collected editions

Trade paperbacks

Hardcover collections

References

External links
X-Men at faqs.org
X-Men comics on Marvel.com

Uncannyxmen.net
X-Men Legacy Annotations

1991 comics debuts
2001 comics endings
2001 comics debuts
2004 comics endings
2004 comics debuts
2008 comics endings
X-Men titles
Comics by Chris Claremont
Comics by Jim Lee
Comics by Christos Gage
Comics by Fabian Nicieza
Defunct American comics